Jan Wijn (19 May 1934 – 12 July 2022) was a Dutch pianist and pedagogue.

Wijn studied at the Amsterdam Conservatory under Cornelius Berkhout, where he received his diploma in 1955. He then studied under Béla Síki in Switzerland and Alicia de Larrocha in Spain. In 1960, Jan Wijn won first place in the "concours van Ourense" (international piano competition in Ourense (Spain)). Up to 1975 Jan Wijn had an international as well as national career. Problems with his right hand caused him to retire from 1976 to 1997, although he continued to play with only his left hand and eventually regained full mobility.

His students included Ronald Brautigam, Wibi Soerjadi, Hans Eijsackers, Paolo Giacometti, Frank Peters, Miguel Ituarte, Lucas & Arthur Jussen, and Nino Gvetadze.

References

External links
 
International Holland Music Sessions 
Jan Wijn receives Order of Oranje-Nassau

1934 births
2022 deaths
20th-century classical composers
21st-century classical composers
Dutch classical pianists
Dutch male classical composers
Dutch classical composers
Musicians from Amsterdam
Classical pianists who played with one arm
Male classical pianists
21st-century classical pianists
20th-century Dutch male musicians
21st-century male musicians
20th-century classical pianists